Sea is the third studio album by Japanese singer and songwriter Aiko Kitahara. It was released on May 11, 2006, through Giza Studio.

The album consists of four previous released singles, such as Te Quiero Te Amo ~Natsu no Natsu no Koi~, Tango, Mou Ichido Kimi ni Koishiteiru and Moshi mo Umare Kawattara Mou Ichido Aishitekuremasuka?.

A special website was launched to promote album with preview tracks and liner notes.

The album charted at #78 on the Oricon charts in its first week. It charted for two weeks.

Track listing

In media
Tango – ending theme for Anime television series Fighting Beauty Wulong
opening theme for Chiba TV program MU-GEN〜Music Generations〜
Mou Ichido Kimi ni Koishiteiru – ending theme for Anime television series Government Crime Investigation Agent Zaizen Jotaro
Moshi mo Umare Kawattara Mou Ichido Aishitekuremasuka? – opening theme for Chiba TV program MU-GEN〜Music Generations〜
Dream☆ing – theme song for Ohsaka's Commercial facility EST (West Japan Railway Company)
Te Quiero Te Amo ~Natsu no Natsu no Koi~ - ending theme for Nihon TV program Himitsu no Hiramekin

References

2006 albums
Aiko Kitahara albums
Being Inc. albums
Japanese-language albums
Giza Studio albums
Albums produced by Daiko Nagato